Baron Netherthorpe, of Anston in the West Riding of the County of York, is a title in the Peerage of the United Kingdom. It was created in 1959 for James Turner, President of the National Farmers Union and of the Royal Agricultural Society.  the title is held by his grandson, the third Baron, who succeeded his father in 1982.

Barons Netherthorpe (1959)
James Turner, 1st Baron Netherthorpe (1908–1980)
James Andrew Turner, 2nd Baron Netherthorpe (1936–1982)
James Frederick Turner, 3rd Baron Netherthorpe (b. 1964)

The heir apparent is the present holder's son Hon. Andrew James Edward Turner (b. 1993).

Line of Succession

  James Turner, 1st Baron Netherthorpe (1908–1980)
  James Andrew Turner, 2nd Baron Netherthorpe (1936–1982)
  James Frederick Turner, 3rd Baron Netherthorpe (born 1964)
 (1) Hon. Andrew James Edward Turner (b. 1993)
 (2) Hon. John Patrick William Turner (b. 2001)
 (3) Hon. Patrick Andrew Turner (b. 1971)
 Hon. Edward Neil Turner (c. 1941–2010)
 (4) Major Charles James Turner (b. 1966)
 (5) Edward Nicholas Turner (b. 1995)
 (6) Henry James Turner (b. 1997)
 (7) William Frederick Turner (b. 2001)
 (8) Hon. Philip Noel Nigel Turner (b. 1949)

Arms

References

Kidd, Charles, Williamson, David (editors). Debrett's Peerage and Baronetage (1990 edition). New York: St Martin's Press, 1990.

Baronies in the Peerage of the United Kingdom
Noble titles created in 1959